Phinergy is an Israeli clean energy company developing metal-air technology, turning metals – namely aluminum and zinc - into a new way to store, transport and generate clean and safe energy. Applications include energy backup for critical sites (as a replacement to lead-acid batteries or diesel generators), range extension for electric vehicles, or low-cost renewable energy storage. The company was founded in 2009 by Aviv Tzidon, currently Phinergy's Chairman. The company's CEO is David Mayer. 

The company's technology originates at Bar Ilan University, and has been further developed by Phinergy, turning the technology into products for various applications. 

In February 2021, Phinergy completed an IPO at the Tel Aviv Stock Exchange.

Strategic partnerships 
In March 2021, Phinergy and Indian Oil formed a joint venture in India for collaboration in the sector of Al-air battery system. This includes research and development, customization, assembly, manufacturing and sale of aluminium-air batteries for the Indian market, specifically electric vehicles.

References

Technology companies of Israel
Electric vehicle battery manufacturers